Salvia lankongensis is a perennial plant that is native to Yunnan province in China, growing in grasslands and thickets at  elevation.

Notes

lankongensis
Flora of China